Heagney is a surname. Notable people with the surname include:

Denis Heagney (1898–1942), Australian rules footballer
Muriel Agnes Heagney (1885–1974), Australian trade unionist and feminist
Robert W. Heagney, American lawyer and politician

See also
Heaney